Agnieszka Stanuch (born 21 November 1979 in Lubań) is a Polish slalom canoeist who competed at the international level from 1994 to 2008.

She competed in two Summer Olympics and earned her best finish of fifth in the K1 event in Beijing in 2008.

She is daughter of former Polish slalom canoeist Jerzy Stanuch.

References

External links 
 
 
 

1979 births
Canoeists at the 2004 Summer Olympics
Canoeists at the 2008 Summer Olympics
Living people
Olympic canoeists of Poland
People from Lubań
Polish female canoeists
Sportspeople from Lower Silesian Voivodeship